The  is a pilgrimages route of 13 Buddhist temples in Tama, Tokyo. Each temple is dedicated to one of the Thirteen Buddhas.

Directory

See also

 Thirteen Buddhas

External links 
Website listing
Website listing

Buddhist temples in Tokyo
Buddhism in Tokyo
Buddhist pilgrimage sites in Japan
Religious buildings and structures in Tokyo
Japanese pilgrimages
Tama, Tokyo